"Tennessee" is the fourth promotional single from French music producer and DJ Bob Sinclar's studio album Western Dream, featuring Farrell Lennon. The record was released in January 2007 via Yellow Productions label.

Release
The full CD release of the single was cancelled in March 2007 in favour of the new song, "Sound of Freedom". It was confirmed on the Bob Sinclar official website.

Credits 
Backing Vocals – Bob Sinclar, Farrell Lennon
Bass – Zaf
Guitar – Anatole Wisniak, "Tom Tom" Naim
Keyboards – Cutee B
Lead Vocals, Featuring – Farrell Lennon

Effects [Beat Booming, Loop] – Bob Sinclar
Producer – Bob Sinclar

References

External links
Official website

Bob Sinclar songs
2006 singles
2005 songs
Yellow Productions singles
Songs written by Bob Sinclar